Gianluca Gauzzi Broccoletti, commonly known as Gianlucca Gauzzi, (born 3 June 1974) is an Italian security professional who has been director of the Directorate for Security Services and Civil Protection of the Vatican City State and commander of the Gendarmerie Corps since 15 October 2019. He was previously deputy director and deputy commander.

Biography 
Gianluca Gauzzi Broccoletti was born in Gubbio, Perugia, on 3 June 1974. He graduated from Sapienza University of Rome with a degree in safety engineering and protection. He and his wife have two children.

He joined the Gendarme Corps in 1995. In 1999 he was given responsibility for the design and development of the networking technology and security infrastructure of the Vatican City State and for cybersecurity as well. In 2010 he was transferred to the Operational Security Center. He became a manager in 2017 and a deputy director and deputy commander in 2018.

He coordinated security at Castel Gandolfo when Popes John Paul II and Benedict XVI used it as their summer residence. He helped manage technological security during the 2005 and 2013 conclaves. He has represented the Security and Civil Protection Services in its relations with the City of Rome and other police forces. He also testified on occasion as an expert witness at Vatican criminal proceedings.

On 15 October 2019, Pope Francis appointed Broccoletti to succeed Domenico Giani, who resigned after the Italian weekly magazine L'Espresso published confidential material relating to an ongoing investigation of financial crimes by several Vatican employees.

References 

Additional sources 
 

Living people
1974 births
People from Gubbio
Vatican City police officers
Chiefs of police
Italian Roman Catholics